Borcea is a commune situated in the eastern part of Călărași County, Muntenia, Romania. It is one of the most populous communes in the county and it is situated on the west bank of the Borcea branch (a section of the Danube). The commune was formed  as a result of the administrative reform of 1968 by joining two neighboring villages, Cocargeaua and Pietroiu. Today, it is composed of two villages, Borcea and Pietroiu.

The commune is home to the Romanian Air Force 86th Air Base.

History

Antiquity 
The oldest archaeological findings in Borcea date from III-IV BC and consist of ancient pottery, Macedonian amphorae and a silver drachma issued by the ancient city of Histria. The presence of numerous archaeological evidence in Borcea which originated from the Greek colonies in Dobruja lead to the conclusion that between Getic settlements that were strung along the Borcea branch and the greek colonies there were cultural and economic exchanges.
This layer of archaeological findings (III-IV B.C.) is covered by a Roman layer (II – IV A.D.) of pottery and other materials.

Middle Ages 
The next archaeological layer (IX- XII A.D.) consists of evidence of medieval culture (coins and pottery). Because of the loss of many documents that relate to the beginning of medieval Romania, the first time Borcea is mentioned in an official document takes place only at the beginning of sec. XVI. 
At 15 December 1501, Prince Radu IV the Great of Wallachia issued a charter that confirmed that the property of Nucet monastery 
extends from Săltava pond to the Tâmburești (now Borcea) village. Later, another charter from the time of Prince Vlad VI of Wallachia, dated 6 July 1530, confirmed the possession of "the long creek of Tâmburești". On 18 November 1614, the entire Tâmburești village and the nearby land becomes the property of Plumbuita monastery following a decree of Prince Radu Mihnea of Wallachia. From 1614 to 1863 Tâmburești is administered by the abbot of Plumbuita monastery. The peasants lost ownership of their lands.

Late modern and contemporary 

In 1863 as a result of secularization of monastery estates in Romania and the Agrarian Law imposed by Alexandru Ioan Cuza (1820–1873) the monastery lost ownership of Tâmburești and the peasants regained possession of their lands. This reform also led to Tâmburești being completely separated in two neighboring villages: Pietroiu and Cocargeaua.

During the early years of the communist regime (1949–1962) in Romania, Borcea (Pietroiu and Cocargeaua) went through a processes of collectivization of agriculture. Personal property (lands, agricultural machinery etc. ) was confiscated by the communist state and two I.A.S. (State Agricultural Institution) were formed : I.A.S. Pietroiu and I.A.S. Borcea. These state administered institutions were basically collective farming units. In the assessment of historian Stan Stoica, collectivization seriously harmed the Romanian village: he cites the loss of "independence, dignity and identity" by the peasants; a decline in the rural population that accelerated when young people migrated to the cities (forced industrialization was going on at the same time); and the fact that families were "wrecked" by poverty, while interest in work plummeted.
Another administrative reform came on 17 February 1968 which merged Pietroiu and Cocargeaua back together into a single commune that was called Borcea after the "Borcea branch" of the Danube river. During 1968-1981 Borcea commune was part of Ialomița County. As a result of the State Council Decree no. 15 of 23 January 1981 Borcea was included in the newly formed Călărași County.

Geography

Topography 

Borcea is located in south-east part of Romania, on the west side of the Borcea branch, approximately 35 km (37 mi) north of the Bulgarian border and 75 km west of the Black Sea. Its geographical coordinates are 44 ° 20' north latitude and 27 ° 45' east longitude. 
Because Borcea is situated on the east side of the vast Romanian Plain more precisely in the subdivision Bărăgan of Ialomiţa Plain it has a flat topography with a minimum elevation of 9 m (30 ft) in the flood plain of the Borcea branch and maximum elevation of 47 m (155 ft) in the northwestern part of the commune. The arable land administered by the commune extends on either side of the Borcea branch with most of the farmland on the west side.
Occupying an habitable area of 5.35 square kilometres (2 sq miles), its nearest city Fetești is situated just 5 km north of its location.
Romanian Plain was formed at the end of the Cenozoic−Quaternary period by intense sedimentation of the Sarmatian Sea and the gradually withdrawal of the water from north to south and from west to east. This process formed loess as deep as 40 meters below the Borcea commune. As a result, the soil in the surrounding region is very fertile because of the high humus content. This soil is called chernozem.

Climate

According to Köppen climate classification system Borcea has a humid continental climate typified by large seasonal temperature differences, with warm to hot summers and cold (sometimes severely cold) winters. The average annual temperature is 11.2 °C, in July the average temperature fluctuates around 23 °C, and in January there is an average of −3 °C. The lowest temperature recorded in the area dates from 8 January 1938 when there was −30 °C, and the highest of 41.4 °C on 10 August 10, 1951. The Borcea commune enjoys a high calorie potential, whose value reached 125 kcal/cm2.

Borcea sits at the influence of the crivăţ wind, a cold continental wind which blows in the winter from north east creating blizzard conditions, a hot and humid wind called "Băltărețul" from the south, and the Westerlies.

The continental climate is emphasized by the annual amounts of precipitation falling on the commune and its surroundings. Thus, average annual precipitation is only 500 mm, due to the influence exercised by ascending currents that arose on nearby lake surfaces and the Borcea branch. Annual maximum is recorded in May–June and a minimum in July–August, during which the sky is mostly clear and brief periods of drought may occur.

Law and government

Administration 
The commune is governed by a mayor–council system. In Borcea, the central government is responsible for public education, libraries, public safety, recreational facilities, sanitation, water supply and welfare services. The mayor and councillors are elected to four-year terms. Decisions are approved and discussed by the local council (consiliu local) made up of 14 elected Councillors.

In Romania the two round system is used to elect the Mayors. The number of votes needed to win in the first round is calculated using the local electoral list. To elect the Local Councils, the closed party list proportional representation is used, with a 5% threshold of the votes at the constituency level.

From 2004, the mayor office was held by Marcel Zăgărin who was re-elected in 2008. The last local elections took place in 2008 on June 1 (first round) and June 15 (second round). In the first round Marcel Zăgărin (PC) was leading with 46.43% of the votes closely followed by Zaharia Costică (PNL) with 38.30%. In the third place was Cristian Burlacu Ion (PSD) with 5.62% and in the fourth Crinel Din (PD-L) with 5.52%. On 15 June 2008, the current mayor won the elections round with 53.62% of the votes to 46.37% for his closest opponent and former mayor of Borcea, Zaharia Costică.

Central government 

Borcea is part of Călărași County's 2nd electoral district of the Chamber of Deputies, which is currently represented by Ioan Damian (PSD). Although Jenel Serban (PNL) won the 2008 elections in the district with 36.21% of the votes to 30.32% for Ioan Damian he lost the  deputy mandate to Eugen Nicolaescu, a party colleague, after the county redistribution of votes.

In the Senate, Borcea is represented by Vasile Nedelcu (PNL), winner at the 2008 elections for Călărași County's 1st Senate electoral district

Architecture and landmarks

Vernacular architecture in Borcea 

Many of the houses in Borcea are built using traditional means of construction and locally sourced materials. The masonry construction of the houses use sun-dried mudbricks called chirpici. Finer adobe is also used for exterior coating and as a binding material. The exterior of a house is usually covered with a layer of lime. Some houses are decorated with traditional motifs. The simple ridged roof consists of declined rafters that rest on vertical wall-plates on top of each wall. Tiles are often used as a roof covering although galvanised steel and bitumen could also be found. The roof often extends toward the front of a house to cover a small porch. Supporting frames are seldom used in this type of construction and are usually made of wood. Building an mudbrick house is a community effort with relatives of the house owner assisting in the erection of the building.

Church Saint Nicholas
Church Saint Nicholas was built between 1909-1911 in distinct neo-Byzantine architecture. 
It has a typical cross-shaped design with two hemispherical domes, arcades blending into the domes with tin roofing that flows smoothly around the arches and a relatively small belltower. The interior is decorated with mural paintings and a large iconostasis that separates the nave from the sanctuary. There are no seats or pews as in the West, but high-armed chairs placed along the walls traditionally called "strana pl.strane".
 
It was founded by nobleman Miniu Ion and the first parish priest was Radu Nicolescu. It underwent a foundation reinforcement in 1931, and nave vault repairs in 1941.

Demographics 
According to the National Institute of Statistics, the commune's population in July 2011 was 9,982 inhabitants. in an area of 5.35 km2 (2.07 sq mi). The population density is 20.1 people/km2.

In the commune the population was spread out, with 19.82% under the age of 14, 58.34% from 14 to 59 and 21.85% who were 60 years of age or older. The males represented 50.11% of the population while the females 49.89%.

According to the 2002 Romanian census, 99.15% (9,612 people) of the population of Borcea are ethnic Romanians. The remainder is composed of Roma 0.78% (76 people), Hungarians 0.03% (3 people) and Lipovans 0.03% (3 people).

In terms of religion, 99.13% (9610 people) of the population are Romanian Orthodox and 0.69% (67 people) are Seventh-day Adventist. The Roman Catholic and the Reformed communities claim 0.14% (14 people) and 0.03% (3 people) of the population respectively.

Romanian is spoken as a first language by 99.82% of the population of Borcea. Vlax Romani is spoken by 0.12% (12 people), Hungarian by 0.03% (3 people) and Russian by 0.02% (2 people) of the population.

The population of Borcea is experiencing a decline since the fall of the communist regime due to the proximity to the cities Călărași (34 km) and Fetești (5 km) and the 2007 integration of Romania into the European Union. This led to the widespread migration of the population to the nearby cities or higher income countries where there are better job opportunities and higher salaries.

Economy 
The economy of the Borcea commune revolves around agriculture, fishing and retailing. As of 2011 over 200 companies were registered in Borcea, 32 agricultural companies, of which three are former state farms operating more than 8,000 ha of arable land.

The commune's budget for 2011 was 7,413,000 RON (approx 1,705,000 EUR).

Tourism in Borcea is based on the fishing and hunting activities.

Top ten companies after annual turnover (2010):

Transport

Borcea is served by two roads DN3B (which runs through Călărași and Fetești) and DJ 308A (which links Borcea to the national road DN3A).
Borcea still relies on gravel roads for inner commune transportation.
The nearest train station is in Fetești 12 km away.

Notable people
 Vasile Adamescu, deafblind educator

References

Borcea
Localities in Muntenia